A Fortress in the Mountains is a 1953 Soviet adventure film directed by Vladimir Gerasimov and Konstantin Yudin and starring Vladlen Davydov, Marina Kuznetsova and Yelena Shatrova. It was made by Mosfilm using the Sovcolor process. It was the third most successful Soviet film at the box office that year, with attendance figures of 44.8 million.

The film is an early Cold War action thriller, set in Central Asia,

Synopsis
From Moscow arrives Senior Lieutenant Lunin to the frontier who is assigned as its deputy chief. Due to the illness of the former chief, the lieutenant has to take command of the outpost. At the same time foreign intelligence is trying to enter the USSR territory. Near the state border under the guise of archaeologists spies under the name of Stanley and Marrow are deployed. The local Basmach gang of Ismail-Beg who are paid by their leadership, is trying to make an attack on Soviet territory as a diversion to their main operation - their imperceptible transition to the Soviet side. However, the operation fails; the gang is broken up, its remnants thrown over the border river and the violator spies are arrested and exposed.

Cast
 Vladlen Davydov as Lunin
 Marina Kuznetsova as Vera Alexandrovna
 Yelena Shatrova as Polina Antonovna
 Sergei Gurzo as Kuleshov
 Stanislav Chekan as Martshenko
 Arkadi Shcherbakov as Prochorov
 Aleksandr Susnin as Vorobev
 Mikhail Majorov as Grachyov
 Vladimir Popov as Sledovatel
 Mukhamejan Kasymov as Ismail-Beg
 Vladimir Belokurov as Marrow
 Aleksey Krasnopolsky as Bridger
 Oleg Solyus as Ben Stanley
 Georgi Chernovolenko as Carter
 Nina Agapova as Marya Tikhonovna
 Boris Popov as Inspector
 Radner Muratov as Akhmet
 Aleksey Alekseev as Ustinov – mayor

References

Bibliography 
 Hutchings, S. Russia and its Other(s) on Film: Screening Intercultural Dialogue. Springer, 2008.
 Rollberg, Peter. Historical Dictionary of Russian and Soviet Cinema. Scarecrow Press, 2008.

External links 
 

1953 films
1953 adventure films
Soviet adventure films
Russian adventure films
1950s Russian-language films
Films directed by Konstantin Yudin
Films directed by Vladimir Gerasimov
Cold War spy films